Major General Richard Hebden O'Grady-Haly,  (22 February 1841 – 8 July 1911) was a British Army officer who served as General Officer Commanding the Militia of Canada from 1900 to 1902.

Military career
Born the son of General Sir William O'Grady Haly, O'Grady-Haly was commissioned into the British Army in 1858.

He served with the Nile Expedition in 1882 and took part in the action of El Maffar, both actions at Kassassin and the Battle of Tel el-Kebir.

He commanded the Second Column of the Hazara Field Force and was mentioned in dispatches in 1888.

He commanded the 1st Battalion the Suffolk Regiment in India and went on to be Assistant Adjutant-General in Belfast in 1891. He was appointed General Officer Commanding the Militia of Canada in 1900.

He also was a surveyor and when he was a lieutenant colonel, and invented a compass clinometer system which was built by Elliott Bros. Pictures of the compass can be seen in the online compass museum COMPASSIPEDIA.

Family
In 1865 he married Geraldine Mary Gostling and they went on to have four daughters.

References

1841 births
1911 deaths
British Army major generals
Companions of the Distinguished Service Order
Knights Commander of the Order of the Bath
British Army personnel of the Mahdist War
British Army personnel of the Anglo-Egyptian War
Suffolk Regiment officers
British inventors
Commanders of the Canadian Army
People from Frant
People from Camberley
Military personnel from Sussex